The Azerbaijan Cup 2010–11 is the 19th season of the annual cup competition in Azerbaijan. It started on 26 October 2010 with four games of the Premiliary Round and will end in May 2011 with the final held at Tofik Bakhramov Stadium in Baku. FK Baku are the defending champions. Twenty-two teams are scheduled to compete in this year's competition.  The winners will receive a berth in the second qualifying round of the 2011–12 UEFA Europa League.

Preliminary round
Twelve lower division teams qualified for this competition played against each other over one leg.  The winners of these matches joined the ten teams of the Azerbaijan Premier League 2009–10 in the next round. The draw was held on 15 October 2010 and the games were played on 26 and 27 October 2010.

|}

First round
The six winners from the preliminary round joined ten teams of the 2010-11 Azerbaijan Premier League in this round and
played against each other over one game. The games were played on 7 and 8 December 2010.

|}

Quarterfinals
The eight winners from the first round were drawn into four two-legged ties. The first legs were played on 2 and 3 March 2011, while the second legs were played on 8 and 9 March 2011.

|}

Semifinals
The four quarterfinal winners were drawn into two two-legged semifinal ties. The first legs were played on 27 April 2011, while the second legs were competed on 4 May 2011.

|}

Final
The two semifinals winners participated in this stage of the competition.

Scorers

4 goals:
Winston Parks, Khazar Lankaran

3 goals:

Flavinho, Neftchi Baku
Ģirts Karlsons, Inter Baku

2 goals:

Mehtiyev, Absheron
Eleandro Pema, AZAL
Jeyhun Sultanov, Ganja
Rovshan Amiraslanov, Inter Baku

1 goals:

Zahid Quliyev, Absheron
Mammadov, Absheron
Qafittulin, Absheron
Nugzar Kvirtiya, AZAL
Gvidas Juska, AZAL
Agil Nabiyev, AZAL
Leo Rocha, Baku
Jabá, Baku
Fábio Luís Ramim, Baku
Saša Kajkut, Baku
Ljubo Baranin, Gabala
Bruno Anjos, Gabala
Samir Zargarov, Ganja
Guy Feutchine, Ganja
David Odikadze, Inter Baku
Robertas Poškus, Inter Baku
Ağayev, Karvan
Rahid Amirguliyev, Khazar Lankaran
Adrian Scarlatache, Khazar Lankaran
Julius Wobay, Khazar Lankaran
Andrei Mureșan, Khazar Lankaran
Allan Lalín, Khazar Lankaran
Amid Huseynov, Khazar Lankaran
Ramazan Abbasov, Khazar Lankaran
Huseyn Aliyev, MKT Araz
Koçaliyev, MKT Araz
Elnur Abdullayev, Mughan
Slavčo Georgievski, Neftchi Baku
Javid Imamverdiyev, Neftchi Baku
Rashad Abdullayev, Neftchi Baku
Mirhuseyn Seyidov, Neftchi Baku
İsgandarov, Neftchi ISM
Rashad Mammadov, Ravan Baku
Fakhraddin Murvatov, Ravan Baku
Elnur Huseynov, Ravan Baku
Rashad Mammadov, Ravan Baku
Hacıyev, Şəmkir
Vasif Äliyev, Simurq
Rauf Mamishov, Şuşa
Şahbazov, Şuşa
Ələsov, Şuşa
Boris Kondev, Turan Tovuz

References

External links
Azerbaijan Cup at soccerway.com
Azerbaigan Cup at futbol24.com

Azerbaijan Cup seasons
Azerbaijan Cup
Cup